The 25th Indian Infantry Division was an infantry division of the Indian Army during World War II which fought in the Burma Campaign. It was re-raised within the post-independence Indian Army in 1948.

History

Originally formed in Bangalore in South India on 1 August 1942 under Major-General Henry Davies the Division was disbanded at the end of World War II.

The division's original role as conceived by Army Commander General Sir W. J. Slim was to meet any attempted Japanese invasion while at the same time training actively for jungle warfare. It first saw action, having become part of Indian XV Corps, at the onset of the third Arakan Campaign in March 1944 where it held and enlarged the Maungdaw Base and established superiority over the enemy.

In May 1944 command of the division was assumed by Major-General George Wood, previously commanding British 4th Infantry Brigade in India. In November 1944, supported by destroyers of the Royal Australian Navy, the division cleared the Mayu Range down to Foul Point and occupied Akyab Island. Following this, with 3 Commando Brigade under command, it made a series of successful seaborne attacks down the coast, supported by sloops of the Royal Indian Navy and winning four Victoria Crosses in the process. These actions included the decisive Battle of Kangaw and landings at Myebon and Ruywa to intercept the retreating Japanese.

In April 1945 the division was withdrawn to South India to prepare for 'Operation Zipper', the invasion of British Malaya, having been chosen for the assault landing (amphibious) role. Although hostilities then ceased, the operation proceeded as planned and 25th Division was the first formation to land in Malaya, occupying the capital, Kuala Lumpur, and then accepting the surrender of the Japanese Army. The division was disbanded in Malaya in February and March 1946.

Post-independence
The division was re-raised within the post-independence Indian Army in 1948. In October 1962 the division was under XV Corps in the Army's Western Command. Its headquarters were at Poonch, and it included the 80th, 93rd and 120th Infantry Brigades.

Composition During World War II 
19th King George's Own Lancers (Divisional Reconnaissance Regiment)
Commander, Royal Artillery:
Brigadier G.H. Johnstone (August 1942 - June 1943)
Brigadier A.G. O'C. Scott (June 1943 - August 1944)
Brigadier A.J. Daniell (August 1944 - April 1945)
Brigadier Nigel Tapp (April 1945 - 1946)
HQ
8th & 27th Field Regts, Royal Artillery
5th Indian Field Regt Indian Artillery
33 Indian Mountain Regt IA
7 Indian Anti-Tank Regt IA
Indian Engineers: Sappers & Miners 
63rd & 425th Field Coys Q.V.O. Madras
93rd FD Company Royal Bombay 
325th FD Park Coy Q.V.O. Madras
25th Indian Div Signals
7th Battalion, 16th Punjab Regiment

51st Indian Infantry Brigade
Commanders:
Brigadier T.H. Angus ( - Nov 1944)
Brigadier R.A. Hutton (May 1944 - )
HQ
8th Battalion, York and Lancaster Regiment (until October 1944)
2nd Battalion, 2nd Punjab Regiment (from September 1944)
16th Battalion, 10th Baluch Regiment
17th Battalion, 5th Mahratta Light Infantry (until March 1945)
8th Battalion, 19th Hyderabad Regiment (from March 1944)

53rd Indian Infantry Brigade
Commanders:
Brigadier G.A.P. Coldstream (to August 1944)
Brigadier A.G.O'C. Scott (August 1944 to December 1944)
Brigadier B.C.H. Gerty (from December 1944)
HQ
9th Battalion, York and Lancaster Regiment
17th Battalion, 5th Mahratta Light Infantry
9th Battalion, 9th Jat Regiment
4th Battalion, 18th Royal Garhwal Rifles

74th Indian Infantry Brigade
Commanders:
Brigadier J.E. Hirst (to March 1945)
Brigadier J.C.W. Cargill (from March 1945)
HQ
6th Battalion, Oxfordshire and Buckinghamshire Light Infantry
14th Battalion, 10th Baluch Regiment
3rd Battalion, 2nd King Edward VII's Own Gurkha Rifles (The Sirmoor Rifles)

3rd Commando Brigade
Commanders:
Brigadier
HQ
No. 44 (Royal Marine) Commando
No. 42 (Royal Marine) Commando
No. 1 Army Commando
No. 5 Army Commando

Support Units
Royal Indian Army Service Corps
18th, 39th and 59th Animal Transport Coys (Mules)
68th, 81st and 101st Gp Tpt Coys 
Comp Supply Units
Inland Water Tpt
Medical Services 
I.M.S-R.A.M.C-I.M.D-I.H.C-I.A.M.C 
51st, 52nd, 53rd and 56th Indian Field Ambulances
25th Indian Div Provost Unit
Indian Army Ordnance Corps
125th Ordnance sub-Park
Indian Electrical & Mechanical Engineers
76th, 77th & 78th Infantry Workshop Companies 
25th Indian Div Recovery Company

Assigned brigades
All these brigades were assigned or attached to the division at some time during World War II	
51st Indian Infantry Brigade
53rd Indian Infantry Brigade
74th Indian Infantry Brigade
22nd (East Africa) Infantry Brigade
3 Commando Brigade
2nd (West Africa) Infantry Brigade

References

Sources

External links
 British Military History - Indian Divisional Histories

Indian World War II divisions
Divisions of the Indian Army
British Indian Army divisions
Military units and formations established in 1942
Military units and formations of the British Empire in World War II
D
Military units and formations disestablished in 1946